WomensHub is a Philippines-based non-government organisation that supports "women struggling for self-determination" in using ICTs, or information and communication technologies.

This organisation recently completed three years as a collective. It joined the Asia-Pacific programme of the Association for Progressive Communications's Women Network Support Programme.

Its focus, inter alia, has been to increase the visibility of gender and ICT issues during the Asia-Pacific NGO Conference for the Beijing Platform for Action held in mid-2004 in Bangkok, the capital of Thailand. WomensHub members there ran the internet access facility in the conference site, and provided user-support to conference participants.

WomensHub was created in December 2000 "to advance women and social movement issues in the field of ICTs."

It works on promoting gender equality through ICTs, and also supports the Women's Electronic Network Training (WENT) of the Asian Women's Resource Exchange (AWORC). WENT offers an annual workshop on electronic networking, open to women and organizations, which helps to build skills in women's organizations and networks in Asia and the Pacific.

External links
WomensHub, Philippines

Women in computing
Information technology organizations based in Asia
Organizations for women in science and technology
Women's organizations based in the Philippines